The 1909–10 Magyar Kupa (English: Hungarian Cup) was the 1st season of Hungary's annual knock-out cup football competition.

Final

Replay

See also
 1909–10 Nemzeti Bajnokság I

References

External links
 Official site 
 soccerway.com

1909–10 in Hungarian football
1909–10 domestic association football cups
1909-10